This is a list of Bangladeshi films that was released in 2009.

Releases

See also

 List of Bangladeshi films of 2010
 List of Bangladeshi films

References

External links
 2009 Bangladeshi films at the Internet Movie Database

Film
Lists of 2009 films by country or language
 2009